Korean Polish, Korean Pole, or Polish Korean may refer to:
Poland–North Korea relations (c.f. "a Polish–Korean treaty")
Poland–South Korea relations
People with dual citizenship of Poland and North or South Korea
Eurasian (mixed ancestry) people of Polish and Korean descent

See also
Koreans in Poland